Geoffrey Percival Orme (10 June 1904 – 21 January 1978) was a British screenwriter for television and film.

Orme's prolific film work extended from the 1930s to the 1960s and included a number of the popular Old Mother Riley films starring Arthur Lucan.

His script for the BBC television series Doctor Who, The Underwater Menace, was commissioned by producer Innes Lloyd and recorded with Patrick Troughton in 1967. It featured the notion of Atlantis being buried under the sea and controlled by the insane Professor Zaroff.

Writing credits

References

External links

1904 births
1978 deaths
British television writers
British science fiction writers
English horror writers
English television writers
English male screenwriters
British male television writers
20th-century English screenwriters
20th-century English male writers